Micropterix amasiella is a species of moth belonging to the family Micropterigidae that was described by Otto Staudinger in 1880, and is endemic to Turkey.

References

Micropterigidae
Moths described in 1880
Moths of Asia
Endemic fauna of Turkey